Gregory Mugisha Muntuyera, commonly referred to as Mugisha Muntu (born October 1958), is a Ugandan politician and retired military officer. He is the current President of the Alliance for National Transformation (ANT), a political party he founded in March 2019. He previously served as the President of the Forum for Democratic Change (FDC), an opposition political party, from 2012 to 2017. In September 2018, General Muntu parted ways with the FDC citing ideological differences with the new FDC leadership of Hon.Patrick Oboi Amuriat. On 27 September 2018 he announced in a televised press conference that he and some other leaders had begun what he called The New Formation which later became the ANT.

He served as the Commander of the Army, the highest position in the Ugandan military, from 1989 to 1998. When the National Resistance Army was renamed the Uganda People's Defence Forces (UPDF), General Muntu became Commander of the UPDF.

In 2008, he unsuccessfully contested for the FDC's presidency, against Kizza Besigye but was later elected as party president in 2012.

He is the founder and current Party President of Alliance for National Transformation (ANT)

Early life and education
Mugisha Muntu was born in October 1958 at Kitunga village in present-day Ntungamo District, Ankole sub-region, Western Uganda, to Enock Ruzima Muntuyera and Aida Matama Muntuyera. He had an affluent childhood as his father was a strong government functionary and close friend of Ugandan leader Milton Obote. He attended Mbarara Junior School, Kitunga Primary School and Kitunga High School. (Kitunga High School was later renamed Muntuyera High School, in memory of his father, by Obote.) Muntu attended Makerere College School and subsequently went on to graduate in political science from Makerere University, where he was deputy president of the students union.

Military career
Muntu joined the guerrilla National Resistance Army of Yoweri Museveni the day he completed his university exams, to the chagrin of his family and President Obote, who considered him a son. Early into the rebellion he was shot in the chest but survived after receiving treatment in Kampala. Later he emerged as the head of Military Intelligence after the NRA victory in 1986. In military intelligence he had under his command personalities like Paul Kagame, who would later become the President of Rwanda.

Muntu underwent further elite military training in Russia before becoming a division commander in Northern Uganda. He rose to the rank of Major General within the UPDF. His rapid promotion did not to go unnoticed by other senior officers in the Ugandan military. He was later to serve as Commander of the UPDF. That post was later renamed Chief of Defence Forces of Uganda. As army chief, he oversaw the demobilization of many sections of the army. 
Observers have attributed Maj. Gen. Muntu's quick ascension to the pinnacle of the NRA/UPDF to his reputation as an incorruptible and loyal officer to the President of Uganda. This loyalty was rewarded by the support of the President during Muntu's many quarrels with sections of the army which accused him of trying to alienate them. Prominent among these were the so-called 'uneducated' officers, led by Major General James Kazini. Muntu was accused of creating a schism within the army by showing preferential treatment to educated officers while sidelining those he considered uneducated.

Political career
Muntu was a member of the constituent assembly (1994–1995) and parliamentarian. After disagreeing with Museveni's approach to politics and the military, he was removed from the army command and appointed as a minister, a position he politely turned down. In November 2001, he was selected by the members of the Ugandan Parliament to serve as one of the nine Ugandan representatives to the East African Legislative Assembly (EALA).

On 21 November 2020, Muntu, along with fellow opposition presidential candidates Bobi Wine, Henry Tumukunde, Norbert Mao, and Patrick Amuriat Oboi, agreed to form an alliance together.

Personal life
Since 1992, he has been married to Julia Kakonge Muntu. They have one son, who was born in 1993, and one daughter, who was born in 1996.

See also
 Uganda People's Defense Force
 Forum for Democratic Change
 National Resistance Movement
 Salim Saleh
 Elly Tumwine
 Jeje Odongo
 James Kazini
 Aronda Nyakairima

References

External links
Mugisha Muntu Leads EALA Team to Kisumu, Kenya
Narrative of Mugisha Muntu's Military Career

1958 births
Living people
People from Ntungamo District
Members of the Parliament of Uganda
Makerere University alumni
Ugandan military personnel
Forum for Democratic Change politicians
Members of the East African Legislative Assembly
Ugandan generals
People educated at Makerere College School
Leaders of political parties in Uganda